María Sara Rocha Medina (born 9 October 1967) is a Mexican politician affiliated with the Institutional Revolutionary Party. She served as Deputy of the LIX Legislature of the Mexican Congress as a plurinominal representative. A graduate of the Autonomous University of San Luis Potosi, she worked as a lawyer before serving as municipal president of Catorce from 1995 to 1997.

References

1967 births
Living people
Politicians from San Luis Potosí
Women members of the Chamber of Deputies (Mexico)
Members of the Chamber of Deputies (Mexico)
Institutional Revolutionary Party politicians
Autonomous University of San Luis Potosi alumni
20th-century Mexican lawyers
Mexican women lawyers
20th-century Mexican politicians
20th-century Mexican women politicians
21st-century Mexican politicians
21st-century Mexican women politicians
Municipal presidents in San Luis Potosí
Deputies of the LIX Legislature of Mexico